José Manuel Rojo Edwards Silva (born 15 July 1977) is a Chilean politician and civil engineer.

Rojo Edwards entered into the center-right party National Renewal in 2009. In december of that year he was elected as deputy for the Araucanía Region for the period of 2010-2014. He was reelected in 2013. On September 28, 2016, he announced his resignation from militancy in National Renewal. He tried to be senator in the 2017 election for the Araucanía Region, but did not get enough votes. In 2019 he entered into the Republican Party. In 2021 Chilean general election, Rojo Edwards supported José Antonio Kast's candidacy, and he ran again to be senator for the Santiago Metropolitan Region, obtaining the third mayority thus being a senator for the Republican Party.

In January 2022, Edwards became the president of the Republican Party.

Studies 
Rojo Edwards pursued his undergraduate studies at the Chilean Catholic University, becoming Industrial Engineer in 2002. During the year 2000, he participated in the exchange program at the University of New South Wales in Sydney, Australia.

He graduated as an engineer with the highest honors granted by his university. He obtained the “FIUC Award” granted by his university’s Engineers Foundation to the most outstanding student demonstrating  academic excellence, leadership and dedication to service.

Upon obtaining his Transport Engineering specialization, he obtained the distinguished “Ismael Valdés Valdés Award”, granted by the Chilean Institute of Engineers to the engineering graduate that demonstrates an outstanding combination of leadership capabilities, technical preparation and social values.

In 2007, he completed his Master's degree in Public Policy at the John F. Kennedy School of Government at Harvard University. Harvard University awarded him the Catherine B. Reynolds Fellowship for Social Entrepreneurship.

Work Experience 

In 1997, Rojo Edwards co-founded an NGO called “2000 Mediaguas para el 2000”, which later became “Un Techo Para Chile”.

During 2004 and 2005, he served as Director of Construction for “Un Techo Para Chile”, where he led the construction of 4,500 mediaguas (emergency homes) in Chilean squatter camps.

During 2006, he completed an internship with the trustee of the Universidad de Chile Soccer Team, José Manuel Edwards.

Between 2007 and 2009, he worked as an associate investment officer for the financing of large infrastructure projects in Latin America at the Inter-American Development Bank (IDB) in Washington DC.

In May 2019, Rojo Edwards founded “Ideas Republicanas” (IR). IR is think tank connected to the Chilean Republican Party. Rojo Edwards served as its President and Executive Director up until March 2022. During his tenure, he co-authored and edited IR’s book called “Ruta Republicana”.

Senator 
Senator Edwards has been very active defending Ukraine. He was the first Latin American parliamentarian to visit Ukraine on early May 2022. He was part of the organization of President Zelensky´s first address to a Latin American audience at Catholic University of Santiago. For the 145th World Inter-Parlamientary Union, senator Edwards wrote and defended IPU´s emergency item, condemning the annexation of Ukrainian territories by Russia. This resolution was approved by consensus, with only 5 countries to abstain (India, Mozambique, South Sudán, South Africa and Yemen).

Hobbies 
Rojo Edwards climbed Mount Aconcagua (6,960 msnm) and the Tupungato Volcano (6,560 msnm), ran the Washington DC Marathon in October 2008, and is a member of PADI International (International Association of Divers). Rojo Edwards plays the piano and enjoys creating and caring for his bonsai.

References

External links
 BCN Profile

1977 births
Chilean politicians
Pontifical Catholic University of Chile alumni
National Renewal (Chile) politicians
Republican Party (Chile, 2019) politicians
21st-century Chilean politicians
Living people
Harvard Kennedy School alumni
Chilean anti-communists
Senators of the LVI Legislative Period of the National Congress of Chile